Lemyra khasiana is a moth of the family Erebidae. It was described by Thomas in 1990. It is found in eastern India (Assam, Khasi Hills).

References

 

khasiana
Moths described in 1990